Hammoudi Al-Harithi (born July 7, 1936 in Baghdad) is an Iraqi actor, who is also known for comedian female roles. Famously known for his role of A'bousi of the 1960s Iraqi television comedian Tahit Moos Al-Hallaq.

References

1936 births
20th-century Iraqi male actors
Living people
Iraqi male television actors
People from Baghdad